In parallel processing, the Hilbert curve scheduling method turns a multidimensional task allocation problem into a one-dimensional space filling problem using Hilbert curves, assigning related tasks to locations with higher levels of proximity. Other space filling curves may also be used in various computing applications for similar purposes.

The SLURM job scheduler which is used on a number of supercomputers uses a best fit algorithm based on Hilbert curve scheduling in order to optimize locality of task assignments.

See also
 Job scheduling
 Supercomputer operating systems

References

Job scheduling
Supercomputing